Crowton is a civil parish in Cheshire West and Chester, England.  Apart from the village of Crowton, the parish is entirely rural.  It contains ten buildings that are recorded in the National Heritage List for England as designated listed buildings.  These are all listed at Grade II, the lowest of the three grades, which contains "buildings of national importance and special interest".

Buildings

See also

Listed buildings in Aston-by-Sutton
Listed buildings in Acton Bridge
Listed buildings in Cuddington
Listed buildings in Dutton
Listed buildings in Kingsley
Listed buildings in Norley
Listed buildings in Weaverham

References
Citations

Sources

Listed buildings in Cheshire West and Chester
Lists of listed buildings in Cheshire